Kpayan District is one of 16 districts of Sinoe County, Liberia. In 2008, the population was 10,043.

References

Districts of Liberia
Sinoe County